The Andhra women's cricket team is a women's cricket team that represents the Indian state of Andhra Pradesh. The team competes in the Women's Senior One Day Trophy and the Women's Senior T20 Trophy. They finished as runners-up in the 2018–19 Senior Women's One Day League, losing to Bengal in the final by 10 runs.

Honours
 Women's Senior One Day Trophy:
 Runners-up (1): 2018–19

See also
 Andhra cricket team

References

Cricket in Andhra Pradesh
Women's cricket teams in India